Peter John may refer to:

 Peter John (canoeist), German sprint canoer
 Peter John (academic), British university manager
 Peter John (sculpture), a sculpture by artist John Raimondi

See also 
 Peter St John (disambiguation)